North River is a settlement in the Canadian province of Newfoundland and Labrador. It is located on the northern bank of the North River, about 10 miles north of the town of Cartwright, at the river's outlet into Sandwich Bay.

See also
 List of cities and towns in Newfoundland and Labrador

Populated places in Labrador